The 1961 France rugby union tour of Australasia was a series of matches of the France national rugby union team which toured New Zealand and Australia in 1961. France won an historical match with Australia, but was defeated (0–3) by All Black's led by Don Clarke.
The French most notable players were the Camberaberò brothers, Guy e Lillian, and the captain Moncla.

French players were criticised for their anger: some matches were interrupted by brawls. In the match with South Canterbury, the referee sanctioned many French fouls and expelled the captain Michel Crauste, who had violently tackled Eddie Smith. It is said the old mother of the All Black's player came on the ground to slap the French player.

Results
Scores and results list France team's points tally first.

Touring party
Manager: Marcel Laurent
Assistant Manager: Guy Basquet
Captain: François Moncla

Full backs
Michel Vannier, Claude Lacaze

Three-quarters
Henri Rancoule, Guy Boniface, André Boniface, Guy Calvo, Jean Piqué, Jean-Vincent Dupuy

Half-backs
Pierre Albaladejo, Pierre Lacroix, Guy Camberabero

Forwards
Pierre Cazals, Jean Laudouar, Amédée Domenech, Gerard Bouguyon, Jean-Pierre Saux, Michel Crauste, François Moncla (c), Michel Celaya, Roland Lefevre, Jacques Rollet, Marcel Cassiede

Notes and references 

Rugby union tours of New Zealand
Rugby union tours of Australia
France national rugby union team tours of New Zealand
France national rugby union team tours
History of rugby union matches between Australia and France
France rugby union tour of New Zealand and Australia
France rugby union tour of New Zealand and Australia
France rugby union tour of New Zealand and Australia
France rugby union tour of New Zealand and Australia